Cartilage associated protein is a protein that in humans is encoded by the CRTAP gene.

Function 

The protein encoded by this gene is similar to the chicken and mouse CRTAP genes. The encoded protein is a scaffolding protein that may influence the activity of at least one member of the cytohesin/ARNO family in response to specific cellular stimuli.

Clinical significance 

Mutations in the CRTAP gene are associated with osteogenesis imperfecta,  types VII and IIB, a connective tissue disorder characterized by bone fragility and low bone mass.

References

Further reading